Urodacus is a genus of scorpion belonging to the family Urodacidae. It was described by German naturalist Wilhelm Peters in 1861. The type species is U. novaehollandiae. Its species are native to Australia, and dig burrows. The genus was placed in its own family in 2000. Before this, the group had been a subfamily Urodacinae within the family Scorpionidae.

Species 
Urodacus contains the following twenty-one species.
 Urodacus armatus Pocock, 1888
 Urodacus butleri Volschenk, Harvey & Prendini, 2012
 Urodacus carinatus Hirst, 1911
 Urodacus centralis L. E. Koch, 1977
 Urodacus elongatus L. E. Koch, 1977
 Urodacus excellens Pocock, 1888
 Urodacus giulianii L. E. Koch, 1977
 Urodacus hartmeyeri Kraepelin, 1908
 Urodacus hoplurus Pocock, 1898
 Urodacus koolanensis L. E. Koch, 1977
 Urodacus lowei L. E. Koch, 1977
 Urodacus macrurus Pocock, 1899
 Urodacus manicatus (Thorell, 1876)
 Urodacus mckenziei Volschenk, Smith & Harvey, 2000
 Urodacus megamastigus L. E. Koch, 1977
 Urodacus novaehollandiae Peters, 1861
 Urodacus planimanus Pocock, 1893
 Urodacus similis L. E. Koch, 1977
 Urodacus spinatus Pocock, 1902
 Urodacus varians Glauert, 1963
 Urodacus yaschenkoi (Birula, 1903)

References 

 
Scorpion genera
Scorpions of Australia
Taxa named by Wilhelm Peters